Pakistan competed at the 2000 Summer Olympics in Sydney, Australia.

Results by event

Athletics
Men's 200 m
 Maqsood Ahmad
 Heat 6 round 1; 21.70 (→ did not advance)

Women's 1500 m
 Shazia Hidayat
 Round 1; 5:07.17 (→ did not advance)

Boxing
Men's featherweight (57 kg)
 Haider Ali
 1st round; Lost to Ramazan Palyani (TUR) on pts 5:4

Men's lightweight (60 kg)
 Asghar Ali Shah
 1st round; Bye
 2nd round; Lost to Tigkran Ouzlian (GRE) on pts 17:15

Men's light welterweight (63.5 kg)
 Ghulam Shabbir
 1st round; Lost to Kelson Carlos Santos (BRA) RSC outclassed 4th rd

Men's welterweight (67 kg)
 Usmanullah Khan
 1st round; Lost to Yovanny Lorenzo (DOM REP) on pts 5:4

Field hockey

Men's Team Competition
Preliminaries Group A

 Defeated  (8-1)
 Defeated  (2-0)

Semifinals

Bronze medal match

Pakistan finished 4th

Team Roster
 Ahmed Alam (gk) (captain)
 Kamran Ashraf (vice-captain)
 Mohammad Qasim (gk)
 Ali Raza
 Tariq Imran
 Sohail Abbas
 Irfan Yousuf
 Imran Yousuf
 Waseem Ahmad
 Shafqat Malik
 Mohammad Nadeem
 Atif Bashir
 Muhammad Sarwar
 Sameer Hussain
 Kashif Jawwad
 Mohammad Anis

Rowing
Men's single sculls
 Mohammad Akram

 Preliminary round heat 3; 7:54.71 (restricted to repechage)
 Repechage 3; 7:51.40 (sent to semifinals C/D)
 Semifinals C/D race 2; 7:54.12 (sent to race D)
 Race D for last 5 positions; DNS (did not start)

Men's lightweight double sculls
 Zahid Ali Pirzada and Hazrat Islam

 Preliminary round heat 2; 7:13.62 (restricted to repechage)
 Repechage 4; 7:13.98 (sent to classification races)
 Classification races; race cancelled
 Finals Race C; 6:52.12 finished last

Shooting
Men's skeet
 Khurram Inam
 Qualification Series 1; score 72 15th out of 49
 Final score 119 ended at 23rd out of 49 participants

Swimming
Men's 100 m butterfly
 Kamal Salman Masud
 Heat 1; 1:00.60 (→ did not advance)

References
 Wallechinsky, David (2004). The Complete Book of the Summer Olympics (Athens 2004 Edition). Toronto, Canada. .
 International Olympic Committee (2001). The Results. Retrieved 12 November 2005.
 Sydney Organising Committee for the Olympic Games (2001). Official Report of the XXVII Olympiad Volume 1: Preparing for the Games. Retrieved 20 November 2005.
 Sydney Organising Committee for the Olympic Games (2001). Official Report of the XXVII Olympiad Volume 2: Celebrating the Games . Retrieved 20 November 2005.
 Sydney Organising Committee for the Olympic Games (2001). The Results . Retrieved 20 November 2005.
 International Olympic Committee Web Site

Nations at the 2000 Summer Olympics
2000 Summer Olympics
2000 in Pakistani sport